Egogepa is a genus of moths belonging to the subfamily Tortricinae of the family Tortricidae.

Species
Egogepa crassata Wang & Li, 2006
Egogepa zosta Razowski, 1977

See also
List of Tortricidae genera

References

 , 1977, Bull. Acad. Pol. Sci., Sr. Sci. Biol. 25: 323.
 ,2005 World Catalogue of Insects 5

External links
tortricidae.com

Archipini
Tortricidae genera